Telz may refer to:

 Telšiai, a city in Lithuania
 Telz (crater), on Mars
 Telz (producer), a Nigerian producer
 Telz, Brandenburg, a town in Germany; see List of windmills in Brandenburg
 Telshe Yeshiva, in Wickliffe, Ohio
 Telshe Yeshiva (Chicago)